Dragonaut: The Resonance is an anime series directed by Manabu Ono and produced by G.D.H., Konami, and Nihon Ad Systems, with the animation produced by Gonzo. A manga adaptation of the series, published by Shueisha, is serialized in the Japanese shōnen manga magazine Jump Square. The plot of the episodes follows Jin Kamishina and his adventures with the dragon Toa, and the conflict between the dragons of Earth and their pilots, known as the Dragonauts, and the extraterrestrial entity named Thanatos.

The episodes premiered in Japan on TV Tokyo between October 3, 2007, and March 26, 2008. The episodes were also broadcast on TV Aichi, TV Hokkaido, TV Osaka, TV Setouchi, AT-X, and TVQ Kyushu Broadcasting Co., although the episodes aired first on TV Tokyo. An OVA episode was produced after the television series was broadcast and is included in the DVD collections as a twenty-sixth episode. However, rather than being a continuation of the story from the television series, it is a stand-alone episode. Nine DVD compilations with consecutive monthly releases were released in Japan by Konami. The first of which was released on January 23, 2008, with the last volume being released on September 24, 2008.

Funimation Entertainment acquired the license to distribute the anime series in North America in 2009 and has subsequently released several DVD collections and also streams all episodes of the series online.

Episode list

Dragonaut: The Resonance (TV)

Dragonaut: The Resonance (OVA)
An additional episode was produced after the television series was broadcast and is included as episode 26 in the DVD collections.

Music Themes
Three pieces of theme music are used for the episodes; one opening theme and two closing themes. The opening theme is "perfect blue," performed by Jazzin' Park and ATSUMI. The first closing theme, "Rain Of Love" performed by Yukari Fukui, is used for the first thirteen episodes. The second theme, "FIGHT OR FLIGHT" performed by Yū Kobayashi, will be used from episode fourteen onwards. A single for "perfect blue" was released on November 21, 2007, and a single for "Rain Of Love" was released on the same date. The single for "FIGHT OR FLIGHT" was released on January 23, 2008.

See also

List of Dragonaut -The Resonance- characters

References
General

Specific

External links
 Anime News Network: Dragonaut - The Resonance (TV) episode titles:
 Funimation's Dragonaut Site
 Official Dragonaut -The Resonance- Site 
 Official TV Tokyo website for the anime 

Dragonaut -The Resonance-